Kovačević (Serbo-Croatian), Kovačevič (Slovene and Slovak; feminine (Slovak): Kovačevičová) or Kovačovič (Slovak; feminine: Kovačovičová), is a Slavic surname meaning "[black]smith's son". The surname is derived from Kovač, which means "[black]smith", and is the equivalent of English Smithson.

Kovačević is the second most frequent surname in Croatia. It is the equivalent of the Polish surname Kowalewicz which has the same meaning.

Notable people

Arts
Dušan Kovačević (born 1948), Serbian playwright and director
 (born 1938), Slovakian choreographer
Milan Kovačević (born 1985), DJ/Producer

Military
Sava Kovačević (1905–1943), Montenegrin partisan commander
 Veljko Kovačević (1912–1994), Montenegrin writer and general
 Vladimir Kovačević (military officer) (born 1961), Montenegrin Serb military officer charged with violation of the laws of war

Politics
Anto Kovačević (born 1952), Croatian right-wing politician

Božo Kovačević (born 1955), Croatian politician and diplomat
Milan Kovačević (1941–1998), President of the Executive Committee of the Municipal Assembly of Prijedor

Science
Ferdinand Kovačević (1838–1913), Croatian inventor, engineer, and pioneer in telegraphy
Jelena Kovačević, Serbian-American engineering professor and dean

Sport
Abid Kovačević (born 1952), Bosnian footballer
Aleksandar Kovačević (footballer) (born 1992), Serbian footballer
Aleksandar Kovacevic (tennis) (born 1998), American tennis player
Ante Kovacevic (born 1974), Australian footballer
Božo Kovačević (footballer) (born 1979), Austrian footballer
Darko Kovačević (born 1973), Serbian footballer
Hrvoje Kovačević (born 1982), Croatian footballer 
Johnathan Kovacevic (born 1997), Canadian ice hockey player
Marijan Kovačević (born 1973), German-Croatian footballer. 
Mladen Kovačevič (born 1980), Slovenian footballer
Mihael Kovačević (born 1988), Swiss footballer
Nenad Kovačević (born 1980), Serbian footballer
Oliver Kovačević (born 1974), Serbian footballer
Radomir Kovačević (1954–2006), Yugoslav Olympic judo champion and coach
Sabahudin Kovačevič (born 1986), Slovenian ice hockey player
Saša Kovačević (footballer) (born 1973), Serbian footballer
 (born 1981), Slovenian ice hockey player
Stevan Kovačević (born 1988), Serbian footballer
 Vladica Kovačević (Vladimir Kovačević, 1940–2016), Serbian footballer
 Vladimir Kovačević (born 1992), Serbian footballer
 Vlatko Kovačević (Vladimir Kovačević, born 1942), Croatian and Yugoslavian chess grandmaster
 Senka Kovačević (Senka Kovačević, born 1982), Serbian-Canadian rhythmic gymnast

See also
 Kovačevići (disambiguation)
 Kovachevich, surname
 Kovacevich, surname
 Kovačevik, surname
 Kovačevski, surname
 Kovačev, surname
 Kovačec, surname
 Kovaček, surname
 Kovačina (surname)
 Kováčik, surname
 Kovačić (surname)
 Kovač (surname)
 List of most common surnames in Europe

References 

Serbian surnames
Montenegrin surnames
Bosnian surnames
Croatian surnames